Mexazolam (marketed under the trade names Melex and Sedoxil) is a drug which is a benzodiazepine derivative.  Mexazolam has been trialed for anxiety and was found to be effective in alleviating anxiety at one week follow-up. Mexazolam is metabolised via the CYP3A4 pathway. HMG-CoA reductase inhibitors including simvastatin, simvastatin acid, lovastatin, fluvastatin, atorvastatin and cerivastatin inhibit the metabolism of mexazolam, but not the HMG-CoA reductase inhibitor pravastatin.  Its principal active metabolites are chlordesmethyldiazepam (also known as chloronordiazepam or delorazepam, trade name Dadumir) and chloroxazepam (also known as lorazepam, trade name Ativan).

See also 
Benzodiazepine
Delorazepam
Lorazepam

References 

Chloroarenes
GABAA receptor positive allosteric modulators
Lactams
Oxazolobenzodiazepines